= KaosPilots NL =

Business school in Rotterdam, Netherlands

Kaospilots Netherlands
- Location: Rotterdam, Netherlands

Kaospilots (KPNL) was a school located in Rotterdam, the Netherlands from 2007–09. It was a partner school to the original KaosPilot school in Denmark. It succeeded in launching two Teams (1&2). Team 1 (21 people) was selected by students from KaosPilot Denmark (and Norway/Sweden) in June 2007. Their program started in Sept 2007. Team 2 was selected by the student of Team 1 KPNL, they were 14. In 2009, Team 1 KPNL realised its outpost in Middle East between Tel-Aviv and Jalqamus.

The Kaospilots program is based in the real world and includes multiple projects with partners and clients of the school.

Educational subjects are:

• Entrepreneurship & New Business Design

• Social Innovation & Sustainability

• Marketing & Creativity

• Personal Leadership

• (International) Project Design

• Process Design

In 2009 the school Kaospilot NL closed. After the close down of Koaspilots NL some of its former students (almost a third) and staff, in particular, Pieter Spinder started their own school called Knowmads. A second third decided to finish their educational program and join the KaosPilot team in Aarhus (Denmark). The last third went back to their homeplace to start implementing what they had already learnt during the first and second year.
